The Uncomfortable Dead (or Inconvenient Dead) (orig. Spanish Muertos incómodos) is a Mexican novel written in conjunction by guerrilla spokesman Subcomandante Marcos of the Zapatista Army of National Liberation (EZLN) and Mexico City crime writer Paco Ignacio Taibo II.  The novel is written in the so-called "four hands" method in which one author writes a chapter or segment of the novel, handing it over to the other author who writes the next chapter or segment in response.  The method has been compared to a game of ping pong between the authors.

The concept for the novel and its unusual writing method was suggested in a letter from Marcos to Taibo II, outlining the "rules and regulations".  Within a week of accepting the proposal, the first chapter appeared in La Jornada, an important Mexico City newspaper.  The result was nine chapters of material published in La Jornada from November 2004 to February 2005, with the newspaper's editors promising a complete edition of the work in its native Spanish by reputed Spanish language publisher Editorial Planeta.  The novel will also be released in book format in Italy, France, United States, Greece, Romania and Turkey.

Plot
The story follows Elías Contreras, a Zapatista investigator from Chiapas (Marcos' protagonist), and Héctor Belascorán Shayne, a private detective from Mexico City (a recurring protagonist in Taibo's detective novels), as they try to unravel the mystery of a dead man leaving messages on answering machines, finding out who Morales is. During the book, and especially during the chapters written by Marcos, the reader is introduced to many characters, some of whom only appear for a very short time. The book looks at the politics of Mexico and at neo-liberalism.

References

External links
Online text—link is broken
2007 review
Zapatista detective Review of the English translation, Alberto Manguel, The Guardian, 27 January 2007

2004 novels
Mexican novels
Zapatista Army of National Liberation
Separatism in Mexico
Novels first published in serial form
Works originally published in Mexican newspapers
Novels set in Mexico City